Khalji (also Romanized as Khaljī; also known as Mazra‘eh-ye Khaljī) is a village in Aviz Rural District, in the Central District of Farashband County, Fars Province, Iran. At the 2006 census, its population was 101, in 26 families.

References 

Populated places in Farashband County